Williams Field High School (WFHS) is a high school in Gilbert, Arizona. It is the second high school formed by the Higley Unified School District, and opened in August 2007. Its first students graduated in 2010. The school is named after Williams Air Force Base (which went by the name Williams Field between 1942 and 1948; a local major road also bears the name Williams Field). The school is located near Higley Elementary and the Lyons Gate community.

History
The Higley Unified School District, in the ten years preceding the opening of Williams Field, had undergone a dramatic transformation. What once was a one-school elementary district that sent its high schoolers to Gilbert had morphed into a school district with its own high school and multiple elementary schools. The growth did not stop, and on March 8, 2006, the district broke ground on a 56-acre lot for a new high school. The district eventually opened the  campus to its first students as the 2007 school year started.
The school is built on the same site plan and with the same exterior as Peoria's Liberty High School, which opened the year before.

The original mascot was to be the Pirates, but preference for the Black Hawks trumped the initial decision.

In 2009, the Higley Unified School District worked with the state of Arizona to install a state-of-the-art CTE program for all teachers and students. The project was led by IT professional Brad Niesluchowski who installed groundbreaking software that allowed students to research potential scientific theories. Software program SETI@home was a free program created by the University of California at Berkeley. The program, Search for Extraterrestrial Intelligence, utilizes a radio telescope to scan the galaxy for alien life. Unfortunately, not everyone understood Niesluchowski's vision and the school district spent $1.2 million deleting the software from district wide computers. It's estimated that 2,300 computer processors were burned out searching the skies for proof of E.T.

Marching band and color guard

Marching band
November 2010 The Williams Field Black Hawk Regiment marching band took 1st place in the  ABODA State Marching Band Division III Championships. They were also awarded music and visual performance captions.

In 2012, The Williams Field Black Hawk Regiment took 3rd place in the 2012 ABODA State Marching Band Championships. They also received First place in every percussion and color guard/auxiliary caption over the course of the season.

November 16, 2013, The Williams Field Black Hawk Regiment took 1st place in the ABODA State Marching Band Division III Championships, and were awarded the General Effect, Percussion, Auxiliary, and Visual Performance Captions.

Fall 2014 Williams Field Black Hawk Regiment entered ABODA Division II.

November 12, 2016, The Williams Field Black Hawk Regiment took 1st place in the ABODA State Marching Band Division II Championships.  They were also awarded Percussion, Auxiliary, General Effect, and Music Captions.

Fall 2017, The Williams Field Black Hawk Regiment entered ABODA Division I.

Winter Guard
The Williams Field Winter Guard, a color guard in their first winter season after the opening of the school in 2007, won first place in the Scholastic Regional A division in 2008, at the Winter Guard Arizona (WGAZ) Championships, held in Phoenix, Arizona.

In 2012, the Winter Guard took first place again in Scholastic Regional A at the 2012 WGAZ Championships.

In 2014, the Winter Guard took first place in Scholastic AA Local at the 2014 WGAZ Championships scoring 76.22.

In 2015, the Winter Guard took third place in Scholastic A National at the 2015 WGAZ Championships

Winter drumline
In 2011, the Williams Field Drumline (known at the time as the Williams Field Percussion Project), took home first place in an independent division

In 2012, the Williams Field Drumline took 3rd place in the 2012 WGAZ State Championship.

In 2013, the Williams Field Drumline took 5th place in the 2013 WGAZ State Championship.

In 2014, the Williams Field Drumline took 2nd place in the 2014 WGAZ State Championship scoring 89.60.

In 2015, the Williams Field Drumline took 3rd place in the 2015 WGAZ State Championship.

Football
In 2010, the varsity football team finished runner-up in the 4A Division II state championship, losing in a major upset to 13th-seed Thunderbird High School.

In 2014, Williams Field finished runner-up once again, yet this time losing in the Division III state championship to 1st-seed Saguaro High School.

In 2016, Williams Field had an undefeated season, going 14-0—claiming the 5A state championship trophy, winning 14-6 against 5th-seed Centennial (Peoria).

Clubs
Thespians Troupe #7430
Black Hawk Buzz (TV Broadcasting)
Gaming Club
Smash Hawks (Competitive Super Smash Bros. Team, separated from Gaming Club)
Ping Pong Club
Student Council
Sports Medicine club
LGBTQ Safespace Club
Christian Athletes Fellowship
Color Guard
Key Club
Pi (Math Club)
Programming Club
Chinese Club (Mandarin language)
Book Club
Fashion Club
BioTech Club
Go Green Club
Bowling Club
Best Buddies
Robotics Club
National Honor Society 
National English Honor Society

Citations

Education in Gilbert, Arizona
Public high schools in Arizona
Educational institutions established in 2007
Schools in Maricopa County, Arizona
2007 establishments in Arizona